Go Fridge, also known as Play, Fridge, is a Chinese cooking show produced by Tencent Video. The rights were bought from South Korean television series Please Take Care of My Refrigerator.

Formats

Seasons 1–2
In each episode, two guests bring their refrigerators to the filming studio and sit down to talk with the hosts and other chefs. At the end of examining the fridge, a guest selects two chefs to cook a dish for them to eat; they will each have 15 minutes to cook the dishes, with the winner selected by the guest alone.

Season 3
In season 3, the format changed as two X-Factor chefs, mainly professional chefs, joined the show alongside the six regular chefs. If they are picked to cook and win two head-to-head battles, they may be promoted as regular chefs, as with the case with Jeffrey Chen. In the first two seasons, the chefs must use a required extra ingredient to cook; however, in season 3, due to sponsorship with JD.com, they can order an ingredient or cooking utensil not available in the fridge or in the kitchen. The winner would not only win a badge, but also a golden spoon with jade decorations.

Season 4
The show went through a repackaging and format overhaul that is unique to the Chinese version. The filming area has expanded, there are 4 distinct areas, talk-show area, 2 menu-planning rooms, cooking and dining area that is behind the talk show area, while Gemice ice cream remains the naming rights sponsor. 4 or 5 of the regular chefs would return every 2 episodes on a rotating basis, with 1 or 2 guest members.

The rules have changed to become a team competition, partly in response to season 3, where Liu Kaile and Anaud (X-Factor Chef) were not picked to cook all of season 3.

2 permanent chefs will partner with a guest chef, or 3 permanent chefs will form a team, as well as Jackson and the other guest acting as respective team captains and support people, where they will pick the head chef for each team, who will wear a scarf, and the team will make the dish of his/her idea. By the 4th round, however, Jackson decided to let all chefs make their own dishes, with one main co-ordinator named as Head Chef because Jackson was 0–4 as leader.

Both teams will present one dish or a theme of a few separate dishes, and the fridge owner will pick the preferred dish, and they cannot use the same ingredients from the other team during the initial 1-minute ingredient-picking phase for the talk show segment, which precedes the hosts actually looking through the guests' fridges. The team can ask for the team leaders to bring in additional ingredients and perform basic prep work if required.

The seating arrangements for the dining area has also changed. He Jiong, as referee, will sit next to the fridge owner as hosts of the meal. Team captains will gather ingredients for the head chef, then become support person for doing basic prep work, but are not involved in the actual cooking. Time limit remains at 15 minutes.

The prize for the head chef would be a chef's hat badge made from gold and small diamonds. The teams are fixed for 2 episodes, but the head chefs would change each episode.

Season 5

It is already confirmed in the first episode of season 5 that Jackson and He Jiong will become head chefs and must be in charge of making a dish within 15 minutes.

In the first episode, they are involved in a replication competition, where they must each replicate one dish from a pre-prepared six-course menu from one of the 6 of the regular chefs with only verbal instructions of the chefs. The match ended in a draw.

Jackson is also the regular assistant chef in the main competition, the other assistant chef is the guest not revealing his/her fridge for the episode, it is a two-people team, because in season 4, it is proven that professional and semi-professional chefs can make a three-course meal in 15 minutes, which is well exceeding most home cooks' abilities. The fridge owner picks the head chefs based on the dishes names, the assistant chefs' assignments are based on the head chefs' picks on name tags under the lid of two small cups of Gemice ice cream, which remains as naming sponsor of the show. The menu-planning rooms are no longer in use, they serve as the chefs' green rooms. If the guest only has one fridge, a 'magnifying glass' will show a part of the ingredients without opening the fridge to guess the general idea of the fridge.

Guest also send in a clip of one meal a week before filming to see their eating habits. On episode 3 of season 5, Chi Zi violated the rules of stuffing the fridge with new items on the day of the fridge being moved, so the new items on the fridge are isolated. On episode 5, the opposite problem occurred, as Peng Yuchang had no edible ingredients in the fridge, and only had instant noodles in his backpack, so the chefs are allowed to shop for ingredients at nearly mall and fresh foods supermarket for 30 minutes, and the chefs are picked based on the bought ingredients, with instant noodles being a fixed and featured ingredient.

At 21:00, there is also a Tencent Video VIP-only extra episode (also available a day later on the YouTube channel), where they show behind-the-scenes and uncut version of the full 15-minute cooks.

Season 6
The show delayed filming due to timing and location constraints, and the Korean version has not resumed filming for the new season. Jackson Wang was unable to film in China as he was stuck in South Korea as border restrictions were in place due to COVID-19 Pandemic, then self-isolated when borders re-opened between both countries. Wei Daxun returns as stand-in host for the first 6 episodes. An Xianmin and Vinny Huang also missed filming on Episodes 53–54 due to self isolation from travelling cross-provinces to save their respective restaurants. The set had a more Lego-like and pixelized feel, and guests enter from the side door. The fridges are limited to standardized sizes, and are hidden between the two Lego mascots: Popo (Po-tato) and Todi (Pota-to, new in season 6). Also: To better learn about the chefs outside of work, they will only wear the show's own aprons when chosen to cook, and hands are sanitized with sanitizers before food is served. The cooking guests and Wei Daxun also have an apron of their own. In terms of sponsors, all alcoholic sponsors are banned until episode 7. Lipton became their primary beverage sponsor. Mei Yi Tian Milk replaces Germice ice cream as the naming sponsor.

In terms of fridge reveal, a database of analysis is made pre-show to replace chefs writing tags onto the items.

In the end, the winning chef will teach the winning dish in their mother tongue (regional dialects, if applicable).

Season 7
Unlike the previous seasons, the show transits from the fixed kitchen and dining hall to a "home party" in a three-storey building. Instead of chefs competing for the chance to show off their skills, guests team up with hosts to earn ingredients from their fridges, like games during a house party. Jackson and He Jiong are joined by new fixed members: Nine and AK from the boy group Into1, as well as Chen Ziming as the game planner. Instead of all chefs being around through the season, each episode invites one or two chefs from previous seasons to help the winning team cook with the ingredients they have won. Teams can spontaneously exchange ingredients won by playing games in the designated game area such as ping pong and arcade basketball. Most guests have commented that the new format is much more relaxed and comfortable, including returning guests from previous seasons.

With the main beverage sponsor Cha Li Wang, the cooking portion for each episode includes one interesting dish, dessert or drink that can be made with the help of the drink.

Cast

Hosts

Attendees

Chefs

Episodes

Series overview

Seasons 2-6 have 11 total episodes because of the special.

Season 1

Season 2

Season 3

Season 4

Season 5

Season 6

Season 7

References

2015 Chinese television series debuts
Chinese variety television shows
Chinese cooking television series
Chinese television series based on South Korean television series
Chinese-language television shows
Zhejiang Television original programming